Pristimantis ganonotus is a species of frog in the family Strabomantidae.
It is endemic to Ecuador.
Its natural habitats are tropical moist montane forest and heavily degraded former forest.
It is threatened by habitat loss.

References

ganonotus
Amphibians of Ecuador
Endemic fauna of Ecuador
Amphibians described in 1988
Taxonomy articles created by Polbot